HD 28254 is an 8th magnitude G-type main sequence star located 180 light years away in the constellation Dorado. This star is larger, cooler, brighter, and more massive than the Sun, and its metal content is 2.3 times as much as the Sun. In 2009, a gas giant planet was found in orbit around the star.

Properties 

HD 28254 is a G-type star with a spectral type G1IV/V, indicating that it has begun its evolution off the main sequence. It is estimated to have a mass 11% larger than the Sun's, a radius 57% larger, and an age around 7.8 billion years. It has a luminosity of 1.57 times the solar luminosity and an effective temperature of about 5,600 K. HD 28254 has a low activity level and a larger metallicity than the Sun, with 2.3 times the solar iron abundance.

HD 28254 is the brighter component of a visual binary. Its companion, HD 28254 B, has a visual apparent magnitude of 13.8 and is located at a separation of 4.3 arcseconds. The two stars have maintained the same separation through time, indicating that they form a physical binary system. Furthermore, the radial velocity of the primary shows signs of orbital motion. From its brightness, the companion star is probably a red dwarf with spectral type between M0V and M2V, with about 48% the solar mass. The projected separation between the stars is 235 AU, corresponding to an orbital period of more than 1,000 years.

Planetary system 

In 2010, the discovery of an exoplanet orbiting HD 28254 was published. It was detected by Doppler spectroscopy from observations with the HARPS spectrograph between October 2003 and April 2009. The best fit model for the 32 radial velocity data obtained consists of a planet in an eccentric 1116 days orbit, plus a quadratic trend that is probably caused by the star HD 28254 B.

The planet is a gas giant with a minimum mass of 1.16 times the mass of Jupiter. It is at a mean distance of 2.15 AU from the star, and takes 1116 days to complete an orbit. Its orbit has a very high eccentricity of 0.81, carrying the planet between 0.41 and 3.90 AU from the star. This can be the result of gravitational interactions with the secondary star via the Kozai mechanism.

See also 
 List of extrasolar planets

References 

G-type main-sequence stars
028254
020606
Dorado (constellation)
Planetary systems with one confirmed planet
Durchmusterung objects
Binary stars
M-type main-sequence stars